Krasnoye is a rural locality (a village) in Zheleznodorozhnoye Rural Settlement, Sheksninsky District, Vologda Oblast, Russia. The population was 3 as of 2002.

Geography 
Krasnoye is located 15 km southwest of Sheksna (the district's administrative centre) by road. Gari is the nearest rural locality.

References 

Rural localities in Sheksninsky District